West Branch Laramie River is a  tributary of the Laramie River in Larimer County, Colorado The river's source is Island Lake in the Rawah Wilderness. It flows through Carey Lake then northeast to a confluence with the Laramie River.

See also
List of rivers of Colorado

References

Rivers of Colorado
Rivers of Larimer County, Colorado
Tributaries of the Platte River